The 2000 Brisbane Broncos season was the thirteenth in the club's history. Coached by Wayne Bennett and captained by Kevin Walters, they competed in the NRL's 2000 Telstra Premiership, finishing the regular season 1st (out of 14 teams) to claim their 4th minor premiership before going on to win the 2000 NRL Grand final, their fifth title in nine years.

Season summary 
Brisbane spent the entire 2000 NRL season from round four in first position on the ladder. The Broncos started the season with an unbeaten run of 8 matches before going down to the Penrith Panthers in round 9. The Broncos were the first team to play the newly formed Wests Tigers (Merged team of Balmain Tigers and Western Suburbs Magpies) with both teams sharing the points with a 24-24 draw.

The Broncos went on a Win–loss run for 8 rounds before winning 7 of their last 8 regular season matches to finish Minor Premiers. Also the Broncos suffered their worst collapse in the club history when they led 22-4 at halftime to lose 26-22 against the Newcastle Knights in round 18.

The Qualifying Final was a different story when the Broncos came from 20-6 down at halftime to win 34-20 against the 8th-placed Cronulla Sharks. The Broncos had a week off to prepare for the Parramatta Eels in the Preliminary Final which the Broncos won 16-10 to go into a Grand Final against the Sydney Roosters. From the 10th minute, the Broncos led all the way when Michael De Vere landed a penalty goal to give the Broncos a 2-0 lead, erasing a 0 deficit in round 26 against Sydney when Sydney beat Brisbane 28-0. Broncos led at halftime 10-2 at halftime to go out winners 14-6 to clinch their 5th premiership in 9 years.

Match results 

 Game following a State of Origin match

Ladder

Grand final 

 Halftime: Brisbane 10-2
 Referee: Bill Harrigan
 Stadium: Stadium Australia
 Crowd: 94,277
 Clive Churchill Medal: Darren Lockyer (Brisbane)

Statistics

Honours

League 
 NRL Premiership

Club 
 Player of the year: Wendell Sailor
 Rookie of the year: Dane Carlaw
 Back of the year: Wendell Sailor
 Forward of the year: Brad Thorn
 Club man of the year: Michael Hancock

References

External links 
 2000 - Broncos Mark A Decade Of Domination - rl1908.com

Brisbane Broncos seasons
Brisbane Broncos season